Belkuchi College is a government college of Belkuchi, Sirajgonj.

History
In 1970s there was a great tide of inspiration in establishing colleges in different Belkuchi thanas of Sirajganj. A large number of elites of Belkuchi were also present there.

Since the 2010–2011 academic year, the college has been honored with Honor's College by opening political science, accounting management honors courses.

HSC
 Compulsory: Bangla, English & ICT.
 Humanities: Economics, Social science, civics and good governance, Islamic History, Psychology, Logic, Islamic studies, History.
 Business Studies: Accounting, Business organization and management, Finance, Banking and insurance, Production management and marketing, Statistics.
 Science: Physics, Chemistry, Higher mathematics & Biology.

Degree (Pass)
 Compulsory: History of the Emergence of Independent Bangladesh, Bangla, English.
 BA/BSS: Political Science, Sociology, Islamic History & culture Economics, Philosophy, Islamic studies, Psychology, English.
 BBS: Accounting, Management, Marketing, Finance.
 B Sc: Physics, Chemistry, Mathematics Zoology & Botany.

Degree (Hons)
 Bangla 
 Political Science 
 Sociology
 Accounting 
 Management

See also
 Baniaganti S. N. Academy School And College

References

External links
 Education Board Rajshahi 
 Education Boards of Bangladesh
 Directorate of Secondary and Higher Education in Bangladesh

Education in Sirajgonj